Pitchou Kambuy Manga (born 12 December 1988) is a Congolese basketball player who plays for REG of the Rwanda Basketball League. He also plays for the DR Congo men's national basketball team.

Professional career 
From 2011, Kambuy Manga played for Mazembe and has several appearances in the FIBA Africa Club Champions Cup with the team. 

In April, Kambuy Manga signed in Spain with CB Prat, Club Joventut Badalona's farm team, but the deal did not manifest as Mazembe asked for a transfer sum.

In February 2022, he joined REG of the Rwanda Basketball League (RBL). He was named to the All-RBL First Team for the 2021–22 season. With REG, Kambuy Manga made his debut in the Basketball Africa League (BAL). On 14 March 2022, he had a double-double of 16 points and 10 rebounds in a win over US Monastir.

National team career 
Kambuy Manga represented DR Congo at AfroBasket tournaments in 2017 and 2021. He was the captain of his country at AfroCan 2019, where the Congo won a gold medal. He averaged 8 points and 4.8 rebounds for his country in the tournament.

References 

1988 births
Living people
Centers (basketball)
REG BBC players
ASB Mazembe players
People from Lubumbashi